The Orphan Black Original Television Score is one of two soundtracks released on May 19, 2015 by Varèse Sarabande Records. It features music from the Canadian television series Orphan Black. The show was created by John Fawcett and Graeme Manson. Both soundtracks include a digital booklet when purchased with iTunes. The score includes music from the first two seasons of Orphan Black composed by Trevor Yuile.

Track listing
All music composed by Trevor Yuile except the Orphan Black Theme which was composed by Two Fingers.

References

2015 soundtrack albums
Orphan Black
Television soundtracks